Manihari is a town and a notified area in Katihar district in the Indian state of Bihar. Pincode of Manihari is 854113.

Geography 
It has an average elevation of 31 metres (101 feet).
This place is well known for the Manihari ghat, which connects it to Sakrigali Ghaat, which is situated on the southern bank of the River Ganges.

The town is located on the northern bank of the river Ganges where it meets the river Koshi, thus making the town prone to flooding every year.  Manihari is a small border town between the states of Bihar and Jharkhand. Sahebganj is the district town of Jharkhand which is 9 km from Manihari (nautical mile distance); there is regular ferry service. Chief Minister Nitish Kumar flagged off the first passenger train on the newly converted Broad gauge (BG) section of Katihar-Manihari in Katihar division of North-East Frontier Railway (NFR) at Katihar station. There are few local trains which run between Manihari and Katihar.

The geography of Manihari is unique. The river Ganges (i.e. Ganga) flows eastward up to Manihari and takes a southward turn after Manihari. Thus, Manihari is known as the point of River Ganges's sharp bend leading its eastward water flow to turn to southward water flow.

Manihari Ghat
Before the Farakka Barrage over the Ganges was constructed, people going to the Darjeeling Hills or North Bengal from Kolkata, used to travel by  broad gauge train to Sakrigali Ghat and then cross the Ganges by steamer. On the other side of the river at Manihari Ghat, they used to take a metre gauge train to Siliguri. Once Farakka Barrage became operational in 1975 (the barrage has a broad gauge rail line on it), this route became redundant. There still is a ferry service linking Manihari Ghat with Sahebganj.

Demographics 
 India census, Manihari had a population of 21,783.  Males constitute 53% of the population and females 47%. Manihari has an average literacy rate of 44%, lower than the national average of 59.5%: male literacy is 52%, and female literacy is 35%. In Manihari, 19% of the population is under 6 years of age.

 India census, Manihari had a population of 26,629.

References

Cities and towns in Katihar district